is a Japanese boxer who competed at the 2012 Summer Olympics in the welterweight division (– 69 kg). He is an alumnus of the Takushoku University, and is Second lieutenant in the Japan Ground Self-Defense Force.

Suzuki won the silver medal in the 21st President's Cup in Jakarta, Indonesia in July 2011.

At the 2012 Summer Olympics, Suzuki competed in the Men's welterweight, but was defeated by the eventual gold medal winner Serik Sapiyev in the second round.

See also 
2011 World Amateur Boxing Championships – Welterweight
Boxing at the 2012 Summer Olympics – Qualification

References

External links 
 
 
 
 
 

1987 births
Living people
Olympic boxers of Japan
Boxers at the 2012 Summer Olympics
Welterweight boxers
Sportspeople from Sapporo
Boxers at the 2014 Asian Games
Japanese male boxers
Asian Games competitors for Japan